Volkov is a lunar impact crater on the Moon's far side. It is located to the north of the prominent crater Tsiolkovskiy, and east-southeast of Dobrovol'skiy. Overlying the southeastern rim of Volkov is the satellite crater Volkov J, and the two have merged to form a figure-8 shape. The crater Lander is attached to the southwest rim of Volkov J, making this a triple-crater formation.

The outer rim of Volkov is moderately eroded, with a small crater across the northeast rim and a gap in the southeast where it joins Volkov J. The inner walls are relatively featureless, with a few tiny craterlets marking the surface. The interior floor of the crater is lumpy, with low hills and a few tiny craterlets.

It is named after Russian–Soviet cosmonaut Vladislav Volkov who died in Soyuz 11 mission on 30 June 1971 during the vehicle's return to the Earth.

Satellite craters 

By convention these features are identified on lunar maps by placing the letter on the side of the crater midpoint that is closest to Volkov.

See also 
 1790 Volkov, minor planet

References

External links 
 LTO-84D4 Volkov — L&PI topographic map

Impact craters on the Moon